"You Came, You Saw, You Conquered!" is a 1969 song by The Ronettes. It was their final charting U.S. hit, reaching #108 Billboard and #92 Cash Box.  In Canada, the song peaked at #73 for two weeks.  It was the first of a series of non-album single releases by the group.

The title of the song is a reference to 'Veni, vidi, vici', a Latin phrase popularly attributed to Julius Caesar, who is said to have used the phrase in a letter to the Roman Senate after he had achieved a swift, conclusive victory in battle.

The Pearls cover
In 1972, "You Came, You Saw, You Conquered" was covered by the British female duo The Pearls, reaching the Top 40 in the UK.  Like the Ronettes' version, their record was also a non-album single.  The song was, however, included on a 2005 compilation of the group's hits entitled, A String of Pearls.

Chart history
The Ronettes 

The Pearls

References

External links
 Lyrics of this song
 
 

1969 songs
1969 singles
1972 singles
Bell Records singles
A&M Records singles
The Ronettes songs
The Pearls songs
Songs written by Phil Spector
Songs written by Toni Wine
Song recordings produced by Phil Spector
Songs written by Irwin Levine